Uppuluri Mallikarjuna Sarma  (born 16 July 1939 at Peda Konduru Village, Duggirala Mandalam, Guntur District), S/O Sri Uppuluri Rama Sastry is one of the dedicated members of Khaddar Samsthanam, a trust established by Sri Uppuluri Venkata Krishnaiah and Sri Uppuluri Rama Sastry in the year 1935. He breathed his last on 22 March 2019 in his hometown Vijayawada.

He started his association with the Indian National Congress and has been committed for the same right from the age of 12 coinciding with the initial periods of Independent India. He was the general secretary of Andhra Pradesh State Congress and member of All India Congress Committee.

He has orating skills in Telugu and Hindi because of which he was chosen as the live translator for all the speeches of late ex-Prime Minister Rajiv Gandhi when he toured the state of Andhra Pradesh in 1985.

Sarma contested as an independent candidate  for the Andhra Pradesh Assembly constituency of Vijayawada in 2004 elections where he did a lot of social work in his personal capacity. He is one of the founding members of Gandhi Hills in Vijayawada in association with Dr KL Rao and Pathuri Nagabhushanam, a social activist.

He had served as the Chairman of Madyapana Vimochana Prachara Committee (Liquor Control Movement) since August 2007 and has been very active in the debates  in the propagation of liquor eradication mission.

Prior to being the chairman of this committee, he was the secretary of Ravindra Bharathi and conducted several cultural programs.

Sarma was also conferred an honorary degree by Nagarjuna University.
Shri Uppuluri Malikarjuna Sarma S/o Rama Sastry expired on 22 March 2019 at Vijayawada, Andhra Pradesh.

Family 

Sarma has two sisters and six brothers.

References 

People from Guntur district
1939 births
Living people
Indian National Congress politicians from Andhra Pradesh